Craspedonotus is a genus of beetles in the family Carabidae, containing the following species:

 Craspedonotus himalayanus Semenov, 1910
 Craspedonotus margellanicus Kraatz, 1884
 Craspedonotus tibialis Schaum, 1863

References

Broscinae
Carabidae genera